Eugene Kantor Klavan (May 4, 1924 – April 8, 2004) was an American disc-jockey, columnist and author.

Early years
Klavan was born in Baltimore, Maryland. and attended Baltimore City College (high school). His radio career began with brief stints at Baltimore's WITH and WCBM, followed by WTOP in Washington, D.C., where he would remain until moving to WNEW New York in 1952.  While in Washington, DC, Klavan also hosted, for a short time, a local television show which featured him doing silly things on camera while he played recorded music.

1130 WNEW New York
Klavan is most known for his time as half of the morning program "Klavan and Finch." The program ran from 1952 to 1968 on WNEW 1130; prior to 1952, Dee Finch had co-hosted the show with Gene Rayburn. Co-host Finch departed and Klavan continued solo until 1977. He wrote a biography in 1964, We Die at Dawn, that largely focused on the morning show.  He followed it up in 1972 with Turn That Damned Thing Off, a book about the news media industry. In 1977 he moved from WNEW to 710 WOR and left radio in 1980. He later became a commentator at WCBS-TV, a host for American Movie Classics, and a columnist for Newsday.

Klavan's sons Andrew Klavan and Laurence Klavan are best-selling authors and screenwriters.

External sources
New York Times Obituary
Aircheck at Airchexx
Arcane Radio Triva Bio
Airwaves of New York Article
 WNEW, The World's Greatest Radio Station

References

1924 births
2004 deaths
American radio personalities